This is a list of characters in the Artemis Fowl novel series by Eoin Colfer.

Overview 
 A dark grey cell indicates that the character was not in the property or that the character's presence in the property has yet to be announced.
 A Main indicates a character had a starring role in the property.
 A Recurring indicates the character appeared in two or more times within the property.
 A Guest indicates the character appeared once in the property.

A

Leon Abbot

Leon Abbot is the main antagonist of Artemis Fowl: The Lost Colony. He is a demon who opposed the time-spell at the battle of Taillte, and broke the circle of warlocks as they were performing the spell. In the aftermath, he and Qweffor, an apprentice warlock, merge by lava and magic, and the hybrid is catapulted to the "near past" in France. Abbot retains control of the body, stealing Qweffor's magic. On Earth, Abbot learns how far humans have advanced from Minerva Paradizo. Realizing that any attempt to resume war with the humans would lead to certain extinction, Abbot steals a book and a crossbow and resolves to return to Hybras to spend what time the island has left as ruler.

Abbot travels back through time to Hybras at the exact moment that the time-spell is put into effect and takes out the book and the crossbow, claiming to be the demons' savior. He uses the magic stolen from Qweffor to mesmerize anyone who challenges him for the throne. He took drastic actions upon discovering No. 1's true identity as a warlock, resorting to influencing him to meet a brutal end, whether it be through the burning of Hybras volcano, the dangers of time-travel, or the real threat of being killed by humans. At the end of the book, he kills Holly, while she was with No. 1, and Qwan as they are preparing to perform the time-spell. However, Artemis's quick-thinking and manipulation of the disintegrating time-spell allow him to resurrect her. At the end of the book, Qweffor takes over Abbot's body. Abbot's consciousness is subsequently transferred to a guinea pig to stop him from hurting anybody.

Abbot's demon name is N'zall, meaning "little horn" in ancient demon language. The name is the source of a lot of his resentment towards the older demons. Instead, he calls himself "Leon Abbot" after the general in the book he brought back, Lady Heatherington Smythe's Hedgerow.

In The Lost Colony, Holly speculates that Leon Abbot suffers from acquired situational narcissism; however, in The Time Paradox, author Eoin Colfer describes Abbot as "psychopathic".

Amorphobots

In Artemis Fowl: The Atlantis Complex, the Amorphobots are gelatinous robots originally intended to serve as a crew for a Mars probe designed by Foaly. Turnball Root takes control of them in order to direct the probe back to Earth so they can rescue him from prison.

Jerbal Argon

Jerbal Argon is the owner of a health clinic in Artemis Fowl: The Opal Deception, though he first appears in the first book,  Artemis Fowl. In his first appearance, he watches a video of Artemis to determine if the boy is lying when he says he can escape the time field. In Artemis Fowl: The Opal Deception, Argon is shown at his clinic taking care of Opal Koboi, his "celebrity" patient, who is in a self-induced coma. He is not inclined to release Koboi because she funds the hospital as long as she is in his care. Argon also appears near the end of the Artemis Fowl: Atlantis Complex, treating Artemis, and at the start of Artemis Fowl: The Last Guardian, having cured Artemis Fowl from the Atlantis Complex.

Argon's two best pixie custodians, the Brill brothers, call him "Jerry", a name he later mentions he hates. While he feels he deserves more respect from the employees of his eponymous clinic, he says nothing because good janitors are so hard to find.

B

Arno Blunt

Arno Blunt is a secondary antagonist in the book Artemis Fowl: The Eternity Code.

He is a New Zealand bodyguard working for Jon Spiro, an American businessman. He has bleached-blond hair, tattoos on his body and neck, and is first seen wearing a cut-off T-shirt and pirate earrings. He does not like to be forgotten or ignored. Over the course of the book, all his teeth are blown out and replaced with several sets of customized dentures: a porcelain set, sharpened to points; a flat porcelain set "for crushing stuff"; and a strange set, half filled with blue water, half filled with oil. In an attempt to kill Artemis, Blunt shoots Domovoi Butler, Artemis Fowl II's bodyguard, nearly killing him. At the end of the book, Blunt plans to ambush Artemis but is caught by Butler, masquerading as a spirit from hell, and Blunt confesses. During the storyline, he is represented as everything Butler is not—brash, conspicuous and careless—despite the fact they both have the same job and bulk.

Mervall and Descant Brill

Mervall and Descant Brill are twin pixies from Artemis Fowl: The Opal Deception. They are known together as "the Brill brothers" and individually by other characters as "Merv" and "Scant". Although they are twins, Mervall is slightly older and is considered smarter. Mervall and Descant sometimes finish each other's sentences.  They have appeared on numerous fairy television shows and have attained somewhat of a celebrity status in the Lower Elements, as fairy twins are extremely rare, and pixie twins are even rarer.

Merv and Scant are agents of Opal Koboi. They are perhaps the most competent and faithful of her henchmen, and she places them as janitors in the J. Argon clinic as part of her backup plan. They orchestrate a power failure and rescue her from the clinic, replacing her with a clone. The Brill brothers continue to serve Koboi throughout the rest of the book, performing tasks including piloting and maintaining her shuttle, escorting, and cooking.

However, Koboi's personality changes greatly after her rescue, and she becomes intolerably paranoid and obsessive, taking out her anger on them. She writes a list of rules for the brothers, including demands that they bow before her, avoid looking at her directly (claiming it's "bad for her skin"), not pass wind, not use slang, and not "think too loudly" near her after she begins to claim that she is psychic. The Brill brothers become resentful of her rules, and only fear and the promise of escape to Barbados keeps them loyal to her.

However, Koboi betrays them in the end by ejecting them from her shuttle against the chute wall, leaving them stranded in impact gel. Foaly later reveals that the brothers survived and quickly gave information on Koboi after they were picked up.

The brothers appear again in The Time Paradox as their younger selves, helping the past Opal Koboi increase her magical powers by extracting the body fluids of supposedly extinct animals thrown down to them unknowingly by the Extinctionists. Koboi apparently attacks them at the end of one chapter.  After Artemis escapes from her, Koboi says that she has to blame someone, and in the twins' attempt to escape the ensuing rampage, "they didn't run fast enough".

Domovoi Butler

Domovoi Butler is Artemis Fowl II's bodyguard. His uncle the Major was Artemis Senior's bodyguard, until he was killed by the Russian Mafia when they attacked the Fowl Star. The Butlers have been serving the Fowls as bodyguards since the Norman conquest. His current employer (known as a "principal") is Artemis Fowl II, the main character of the Artemis Fowl series. Along with Artemis Fowl II and Juliet, he is one of the few people who knows about the existence of fairies.

Butler is described as a large Eurasian man, who is almost seven feet tall and weighing 90 kilograms (200 lbs), with deep blue eyes. Like all Butlers, he was trained in Madame Ko's Bodyguard Academy, where he was trained in Cordon Bleu cooking, marksmanship, a blend of different martial arts, emergency medicine, and information technology. He is the third deadliest man in the world, behind only one of his relatives and a martial arts master who lives on a tropical island and spends his days beating up palm trees.

In Artemis Fowl, Butler disarms the elite squadron of the LEPretrieval fairy police force and becomes the first human in history to survive and defeat a troll using an antique set of 14th century armor to protect himself and his sister Juliet Butler. The footage ends up on fairy television, and is later incorporated into the combat curriculum for the LEP. With extensive experience in intelligence missions and dealings in criminals, Butler is usually Artemis' first port of call when it comes to advice, and serves as his sounding board when discussing fairy matters, although this usually annoys him.

After an incident in Artemis Fowl: The Arctic Incident, Butler begins carrying special goggles which allow him to see fairies even when they are shielding.

In Artemis Fowl: The Eternity Code, Butler is shot by  Arno Blunt and nearly dies, but Artemis cryogenetically preserves his brain, so he can be revived by Captain Holly Short. Before he loses consciousness, Butler tells Artemis his first name, Domovoi. This intimate confession later allows him to easily regain the memories he lost. His miraculous resurrection costs him about 15 years of his life, and a patch from his kevlar vest mixes in with the skin over his chest, making it harder for him to breathe and run quickly. Following their mind-wipes, Butler and Artemis are left with no knowledge of how he has aged so rapidly, but Artemis refuses to replace him. The fairies later magically make up for his loss of 15 years so his life span would not be affected.

In Artemis Fowl: The Last Guardian, Butler is hit with a bolt of black magic by the beserkers (spirits under the control of Opal Koboi). He survives due to the kevlar in his chest, but his heart is permanently crippled, ending his career in fieldwork. In the last few pages of Artemis Fowl: The Lost Colony, twelve year old Minerva Paradizo gets Butler started reading fiction. Artemis notices classics including Moby Dick, Gormenghast, The Art of War, and Gone with the Wind on the book shelf of Butler's residence in the fictional village of Duncade, Ireland, where he was awaiting Artemis's return.

Juliet Butler

Juliet Butler is the younger sister of Domovoi Butler. First appearing in Artemis Fowl, she is a charming, clueless girl, who does not help much in the kidnapping of Holly Short, but she occasionally keeps watch on the imprisoned fairy. In Artemis Fowl: The Eternity Code she is training at Madame Ko's academy, learning the skills that her brother mastered. Despite her flighty demeanor, Juliet is able to hit any moving target with any weapon. By the end of her training, Juliet is extremely skilled at dispatching opponents twice her size. Unlike her brother, however, she fails to obtain the blue diamond tattoo awarded to the bodyguards of Madame Ko's Academy, lacking discipline. She then returns to her brother's side after he is shot, saves Artemis from an American hitman hired by Jon Spiro, and participates in the heist of the Spiro Needle to retrieve the C Cube. She reflects that she was not cut out for bodyguard work in the first place, and that the only person she would ever work for would be Artemis. Fortunately, she decides instead to become a professional wrestler, leaving for America at the end of Artemis Fowl: The Eternity Code.

She loses her memories at the end of Artemis Fowl: The Eternity Code, but she is able to regain them when, after being attacked by mesmerized fans of her wrestling troupe, she is saved by her brother.

In The Last Guardian, she is controlled by the berserkers. She is attacked while looking after Myles Fowl and Beckett Fowl, and she almost kills Domovoi Butler while she is under the control of the berserkers.

C

Caballine

Caballine (full name: Caballine Wanderford Paddox Foaly) is Foaly's love interest in Artemis Fowl: The Lost Colony. She is a researcher for PPTV and a sculptor. Foaly gets to know Caballine by talking about his mood blanket invention, and he begins jogging with her every morning, except in cases of emergency.

In Artemis Fowl: The Time Paradox, Foaly and Caballine are married during Artemis' and Holly's three-year absence while time traveling to and from Hybras. Foaly mentions that Caballine's first introduction to him was while she was a suspect his security systems had mistaken as a goblin bank robber. It later becomes a joke between the two of them for Foaly to assure her that she is most definitely the opposite of a goblin bank robber.

In Artemis Fowl: The Last Guardian, Opal Koboi attempts to kill Caballine by sending goblin criminals who had escaped from Howler's Peak. However, her knowledge of the "ancient centaurian martial art of Nine Sticks" delays the goblins enough so that Foaly can rescue her by setting up a time stop.

Briar Cudgeon

Briar Cudgeon first appears in Artemis Fowl as a power-hungry officer in the LEP (Lower Elements Police). During the original mission at Fowl Manor, he plans to backstab Julius Root, hoping to usurp his position as commander. Cudgeon brings in a troll to destroy the whole manor, so he can (in theory) rescue Holly Short after every other inhabitant of the mansion is dead. However, his plan backfires when the troll is defeated by Domovoi Butler, and he is "accidentally" shot by Root, using a tranquilizer finger dart invented by Foaly. The dart's sedative reacts with some illegal brain-enhancing drugs he was experimenting with, and the resulting side effects disfigure his once-handsome looks. He is demoted to the rank of lieutenant and given a job as a recycler.

In Artemis Fowl: The Arctic Incident, Cudgeon begins scheming against the LEP and Root, joining forces with Opal Koboi. He convinces a goblin gang called the B'wa Kell to start a rebellion. They almost defeat the LEP, but are stopped by Artemis Fowl II, Butler, Holly Short, Root, and Foaly. Cudgeon is foiled when Foaly manages to send an audio file to Artemis' mobile phone, revealing how Cudgeon had been planning to betray Koboi. After his planned treachery is revealed, Koboi launches her Hoverboy at him in a rage.  He becomes entangled in the safety rail and falls into an open plasma servicing hatch, where he dies instantly, fried by a million radioactive tendrils. Throughout Artemis Fowl: The Arctic Incident, his treasured weapon is a customized Softnose Redboy blaster, which he uses in a failed attempt to assassinate Koboi just before his death.

D

Doodah Day

Doodah Day first appears in Artemis Fowl: The Lost Colony as a pixie criminal legend.  He is a fish-smuggler who nearly kills PI Holly Short with a multimixer as she chases him during her time as a bounty hunter.  He later claims that all he meant to do was "scare her a little".

Day claims he can drive anything.  He has a device called the Mongocharger, which he uses a nuclear battery to boost any vehicle's power. His infamous driving skills lead the LEP to offer him amnesty for his services. He helps Artemis Fowl and Holly Short retrieve No. 1 from Minerva. Three years later, Doodah Day is Mulch Diggums' partner in the private investigation firm, Short and Diggums.

Mulch Diggums

Mulch Diggums first appears in Artemis Fowl as a particularly gifted criminal. He fakes his own death by convincing Foaly he died in a cave-in while tunneling out of Fowl Manor.  He puts his iris cam on a rabbit and kills it, indicating to Foaly through the camera's vitals that Mulch himself is deceased. Shortly after his fake death, Mulch tunnels his way up to the surface and steals some ransom gold Holly was able to retrieve.

In Artemis Fowl: The Arctic Incident, Mulch is found living in a penthouse in  California, watching 007 DVDs and occasionally going on nighttime walks to steal various Academy Awards. Because of this propensity, the media nicknames him "the Grouch" (after another well-known Oscar). He helps Artemis and friends break into Opal Koboi's lab and escapes again soon after.

Diggums next turns up in Chicago, working as a mobster for the Antonelli family. The gang's next target is Artemis and company, but Mulch foils their plan. He was part of a plan to retrieve the C Cube, a fairy supercomputer. After, Mulch gets caught and goes to a fairy prison. Before he is imprisoned for his past crimes, Artemis gives him an important CD disguised as a gold medallion.

As a dwarf, Mulch has evolved extraordinary talents, which make him an ideal criminal and later enable him to help the LEP. He is able to tunnel through dirt, digest at an accelerated rate, has luminous and sedative saliva, can sense vibrations through his beard hair using sonar, produces gas containing special chemicals which make him immune to decompression sickness (commonly known as the bends), can absorb liquid through his pores (allowing him to scale walls unaided), and is able to break wind with incredible force and accuracy (enabling him to incapacitate Butler in the first book).

Other Facts: Mulch is a kleptomaniac. When he is dehydrated, his pores open up (like most dwarves) allowing him to climb walls.

F

Foaly

Foaly appears first in Artemis Fowl. He is a centaur LEP  known for his sarcasm and paranoid tendencies. Foaly is convinced that human intelligence agencies are monitoring his transport and surveillance network. To prevent them from reading his mind, he wears a tinfoil hat at all times. Foaly cannot be fired from the LEP because he is solely responsible for keeping fairy technology ahead of human technology. His inventions repeatedly help his friends, Holly Short and Artemis, through dangerous missions and often aid in capturing the famous dwarf criminal, Mulch Diggums, with whom he does not get along. Foaly is the inventor of the dart finger Root uses to "accidentally" shoot Briar Cudgeon in the first book. His other inventions include the Iris Cam, an in-eye camera used in almost every book; Retimager, a retina scanner, which helped the LEP correctly identify Opal Koboi's clone replacement; and Titanium Pod, a vehicle propelled by magma flares.

Angeline Fowl

Angeline Fowl is Artemis Fowl II's mother. She is described as pretty in her normal state. However, in events prior to the beginning of the series, Artemis' father,  Artemis Fowl I, disappears, and she begins to suffer from schizophrenia and apparent bipolar disorder, exhibiting symptoms similar to those of narcotics withdrawal. During this time, she has an aversion to Juliet Butler, to Artemis calling her "Mother", and to any amount of light. She also has frequent hallucinations and delusions that her husband's suit is actually her husband, that Artemis is her father, and that she is back on the day she was married. At the end of the first book, Artemis Fowl gives half of the ransom money from the fairies back to Captain Holly Short to pay for a wish that Holly would heal Mrs. Fowl back to sanity.

In Artemis Fowl: The Opal Deception, Artemis changes drastically in his behavior toward his mother.  At the beginning of the series, he barely has a relationship with her, but at the beginning of the fourth book, he feels extreme guilt over lying to his mother in order to obtain a painting.

Angeline Fowl has made appearances, however short, in the first four Artemis Fowl books. (She is only vaguely referred to in Artemis Fowl: The Lost Colony) In Artemis Fowl: The Opal Deception, Artemis II uses a recording of her voice to convince his school of her knowledge of his absence. While Artemis is stuck in Limbo toward the end of the fifth book, Angeline gives birth to twins, Beckett and Myles. She is told about the People by Butler, although the sixth book reveals that she and Artemis I had been mesmerised by Artemis II to forget about the People. In Artemis Fowl: The Time Paradox, Angeline contracts a fatal illness known as Spelltropy, forcing Artemis Fowl II to travel back in time to recover the last known cure, the brain fluid of a lemur Artemis had made extinct when he was 10 years old. It is later revealed that she was possessed by Opal Koboi, who wanted the lemur to increase her powers. At the end of the book, Angeline knows about the existence of the People from Koboi's memories and demands that Artemis II tell her everything. In Artemis Fowl: The Atlantis Complex, Angeline tries to make her son act more like an ordinary teenager, making him call her "mum" and wear jeans and a T-shirt with the word "Randomosity" on it.

Artemis Fowl I

The father of Artemis Fowl II, Artemis Fowl I is a rich Irishman and criminal mastermind who goes missing in Murmansk, Russia, for an extended period of time prior to the events of the first book. The plot of Artemis Fowl: The Arctic Incident centers around the search for Artemis I. While he is mentioned throughout the series, Artemis I appears only in the second book and in Artemis Fowl:The Time Paradox. His desire to be closer to his family after his return repeatedly frustrates Artemis II in his attempts to enact illegal schemes. In Artemis Fowl: The Eternity Code, details in his diary reveal that he is a changed man, who no longer wants to devote his life to crime. In an effort to convince his son of his change, he asks him, "And what about you, Arty?  Will you make the journey with me?  When the moment comes will you take your chance to be a hero?" Artemis II does not respond and this interaction becomes one the catalysts of his character's further development.

Artemis Fowl II

A criminal mastermind, Artemis Fowl II is the title character and an antihero of the series.  He is one of the few humans to know about the existence of the fairies (the others being Domovoi and Juliet Butler). After this discovery, Fowl becomes fluent in the official Fairy language, "Gnommish", in addition to many other languages. Artemis II is ambidextrous (but his left hand is slightly stronger), has the highest IQ in Europe, reads many more psychology textbooks than most psychiatrists, and can divert funds from other accounts into his own. He is the youngest person ever to steal the painting, The Fairy Thief, has beaten the European chess champion in an online chess tournament, and creates excellent forgeries of famous artworks. In Artemis Fowl: The Lost Colony, his left eye is involuntarily swapped with that of Captain Holly Short during the transition from Hybras to Earth, and the middle and index fingers of his left hand are switched around from his first time in the time tunnel.

Beckett Fowl
In 'The Lost Colony', Artemis is gone for 3 years. His parents decides to have babies and when Artemis comes back from his time travel, he discovers that he has twin brothers. Though the two look similar, Beckett Fowl is more docile. He gets called names by Myles, like “simpleton”.

Orion Fowl

Orion Fowl appears in Artemis Fowl: The Atlantis Complex as the alter ego of Artemis Fowl II. While he is suffering from the Atlantis complex, Holly Short shoots Artemis with a jolt of electricity and the impact forces out Orion, a carefree, optimistic alter ego who openly declares his love for Short, but has none of Artemis' intellect. When Orion is in control of Artemis' body, Artemis is able to see and hear everything that is taking place, yet has no control over his body or Orion's actions. Artemis explains that his alter ego Orion is the Greek goddess Artemis' "mortal enemy ... So in [Artemis'] mind, Orion was free from the guilt [Artemis] harbored from various schemes." Orion finally proved himself useful near the end of The Atlantis Complex by making use of the martial arts and marksmanship skills taught to him by Butler which had been ignored by Artemis but stored in his subconscious.

K

Grub Kelp

Grub Kelp is an LEP corporal and the younger brother of Trouble Kelp. Seemingly terrified of almost everything and very sensitive to insult, Kelp mentions in  Artemis Fowl: The Opal Deception that he would like nothing better than to have a desk job for the rest of his life. In Artemis Fowl: The Eternity Code, it is revealed that he regularly lodges complaints about petty issues, such as the hangnail he gets from using Plexiglass vacuum cuffs on four goblins during his patrol with Holly Short.

Notorious for wanting his mother, Grub often threatens to tell his "Mommy" about the menial aspects of his brother that bother him. He claims to have single-handedly defeated Domovoi Butler, the most dangerous human known to the fairies. The events of the first book, Artemis Fowl, prove this war story false; Butler actually lets him go unharmed, as a fisherman would a minnow, with a message to the fairies trying to infiltrate Fowl Manor.

Trouble Kelp

Trouble Kelp enters the series as an LEPrecon captain, who is constantly pestered by his younger brother, Grub. Despite this annoyance, he tries to take care of Grub and ultimately thinks of Grub and his other subordinates before himself. He is one of the most decorated officers of the LEP. In Artemis Fowl: The Eternity Code, it is revealed that he is good friends with Holly Short and, as of Artemis Fowl: The Atlantis Complex, that he went on a date with her. He appears throughout the series, becoming commander during Holly's three-year absence in Artemis Fowl: The Lost Colony. In Artemis Fowl: The Last Guardian, he starts dating the LEP's Lily Frond, a girl who Captain Holly Short thinks is an airhead.

Madame Ko
Madame Ko  is a Japanese martial artist who leads the academy where Domovoi and Juliet learned their skills. She gives the most valuable reward amongst the bodyguards: the blue diamond tattoo.

Opal Koboi
Opal Koboi is a narcissistic pixie genius and the main antagonist of the series.  She uses her intelligence to indulge in criminal activities, such as in Artemis Fowl: The Opal Deception. Foaly is often portrayed as jealous of her genius ideas and inventions. Koboi is responsible for putting her father out of business to found her own company, Koboi Laboratories, and makes her fortune. She attempts to create a war between humans and fairies by undergoing surgery to make her more human. However, the pituitary gland she gets in surgery slowly reduces her magical abilities until, by the end of book, she is forced to use the last of her magic to mesmerize an Italian woman into thinking Koboi is her daughter. Koboi is responsible for the death of Commander Root and General Scalene. Several times throughout the series, she attempts to kill Short, Artemis, and Butler, and almost succeeds. Opal Koboi is voiced by Hong Chau in the 2020 film in an uncredited capacity (dubbing over stand-in actors Emily Brockmann, Jessica Rhodes, and Charlie Cameron), physically portraying Koboi herself in a deleted scene, in which the character is amalgamated with the water sprite of Ho Chi Minh City.

Billy Kong

Billy Kong appears in Artemis Fowl: The Lost Colony and is one of the two main antagonists, along with Leon Abbot.

Born in the early '70s as Jonah Lee, Kong and his family live in the beach town of Malibu, California, and are originally from Taiwan. He is described as having colorful, spiked hair, and he reputedly killed a friend with a kitchen knife.

In the early '80s, Kong is still known by his birth name and lives with his brother, Eric, and his mother, Annie, who worked two jobs to support them. He is left with his 16-year-old brother, who says he was attacked by demons, creatures who attack humans and are able to peel their faces off like masks. The truth comes out that his brother had actually become mixed up in local gang wars and was trying to protect Kong, but he continues to believe the story well after his brother's gang-related death. This belief leads him to the discovery of fairies.

Later, as Billy Kong, he becomes involved in the demon-catching plan of Minerva Paradizo. The demon that Minerva abducts happens to be No. 1, a warlock demon who is not at all bloodthirsty. Billy Kong, the ever vengeful and violent murderer, decides to kill No. 1 and in the process not only jeopardises Fowl's and Minerva's plans, but also No. 1's life.

The last mention of Billy Kong is when Butler (in disguise and accompanied by Minerva) turns him in to the police for an old murder in Taipei, where he is wanted by the police as Jonah Lee.

Dr. Damon Kronski
Damon Kronski is the leader of a cult called the Extinctionists, who believe that any species that does not directly benefit humanity must be wiped out. Every year, he holds a conference in which Extinctionists capture the last member of a species, evaluate its usefulness to humanity, and destroy it if it is judged useless. At the age of 10, Artemis Fowl sells him the last silky sifaka lemur, the only source of a cure for a magical disease that would supposedly infect Artemis' mother several years later. After losing the lemur, Kronski captures Holly Short and makes her the centerpiece of his latest conference. Kronski falls out of favor amongst the Extinctionists when an older Artemis from the future claims that Short is not a new species, but rather a young human girl. His fall from power is completed when an embarrassing video of a young Kronski being attacked by a koala surfaces on the Internet. It is revealed that Kronski was mesmerized by Opal Koboi to help capture the silky sifaka lemur, whose brain fluid had magical time-manipulating properties. He is apparently in a catatonic state when Short uses the last bit of her magic to cure his anosmia.  The first smell he ever smells in his life is from the nearby vats of liquid pigeon droppings.

L

Loafers McGuire

Loafers is a Chicago mob hitman sent to capture Artemis Fowl and bring him back, on behalf of the Antonelli crime family, hired out by Jon Spiro. Born in Kilkenny, Ireland, his real name is Aloysius McGuire, but he thinks "Loafers" sounds more Mafia-like than "Aloysius".  His five-foot frame is covered in tattoos because "every time I complete a job, I get one". McGuire carries a notebook of witticisms he has made—oddly enough, something Artemis Fowl considered compiling after being at a loss for words when Holly Short slugged him in the first book.  Loafers is recruited with Mo Digence (Mulch Diggums under an alias).  During the hit, Diggums betrays him to Artemis.  Despite Loafers' attempts to gain control of the situation, Loafers is quickly subdued by Juliet.  He is later mind-wiped without his tattoos, then relocated to Kenya as Nuru.

N

No. 1

No. 1 is an apprentice warlock demon (imp) and recurring character in the Artemis Fowl series. He first appears in Artemis Fowl and the Lost Colony, where he is one of the main characters. He is featured in every book following The Lost Colony.

No. 1 is a bit of an oddity, even for a warlock. He detests many demon traditions, including eagerness to warp and discrimination against imps. He has nightmares about the spirits of the dead animals he has eaten coming to him and pleading. He first (accidentally) uses magic in a dispute with Leon Abbot, the head of the demons, when he turns a wooden poker from the fireplace into stone and penetrates Abbot's armour after Abbot challenges him to do so.  Abbot tries to kill him by mesmerising him to jump into the volcano on Hybras. This, however, fails to kill No. 1, and instead successfully sends him to Earth.

Minerva Paradizo later kidnaps him.  Before he is liberated, No. 1 develops the gift of tongues in a conversation with  Billy Kong, in which he shrieks, "How can I talk straight, you son of a three-legged dog? I don't speak Taiwanese!" in perfectly fluent Taiwanese. He is liberated by Artemis and his allies, and later plays a part in saving both Paradizo and Hybras. He uses his power of the "gargoyle's touch" to free Qwan, and is one of the five in the magic circle that brings Hybras back to Earth at the end of the book. He allows Qweffor to seize complete control of Abbot's body, to the delight of the newly freed warlock.

No. 1, though intelligent, is somewhat childish in many of his habits. He is quite naive at times, misinterpreting the implications of words said or directed at him. He enjoys stating the obvious, and explaining things of little relevance. He is extremely docile, even by warlock standards and, for a good portion of the fifth book, Artemis Fowl and the Lost Colony, possesses very little self-confidence or pride, often wishing himself away when he is being bullied, rather than wishing the actual bullies away. However, at the end of The Lost Colony, he stands up against Abbot, thus displaying a new strength.

His mentor is Qwan, who sees No. 1 as the most powerful warlock ever to exist.  On Hybras, Qwan states, "In 10 years, he will be able to move the island on his own". At that time, it took five magical beings to move the island. At one point, Foaly states that No. 1 sounded like a cheap romance novel, speaking with medieval vocabulary learned from the book Abbot brought to Hybras.  He uses over-romanticized phrases such as "...I have no idea where we are and where we're going, but I already feel more at home than I ever have."  When agitated, No. 1 uses a large number of synonyms to release his stress. He has a soft spot for a demoness with red markings similar to his own, whom he believes might be his mother.

In Time Paradox, he plays a major role in sending Artemis Fowl II and Holly Short back in time and anchoring them so they can come back with the lemur.

In Atlantis Complex, Turnball Root attempts to force No. 1 to keep his human wife, who is dying of old age, young forever.

No. 1 makes a brief cameo appearance in The Last Guardian, in a flashback.

P

Minerva Paradizo
Minerva Paradizo is a character appearing exclusively in Artemis Fowl and the Lost Colony, where she is 12 years old. She initially served as an antagonist, but after being foiled by Artemis and betrayed by Kong, she allies with Artemis's friends.

She is presented as being equally intelligent as Artemis, a mirror image of himself, but ultimately he is able to best her due to his alliance with the technologically superior fairies, and by playing on the same personality weaknesses he once suffered from. Minerva is a criminal genius who captures the imp No. 1 and tries to present him as her project for the Nobel Prize in Stockholm. She is younger than Artemis but, due to his returning from Limbo three years late, they are now the same age. She believes she can outsmart him when he tries to save the magical world from discovery. According to Domovoi Butler at the end of the book, she has "become quite the beauty", and has developed feelings for Artemis. Minerva is not mentioned in any of the other Artemis Fowl books (though she does come back for one scene in The Fowl Twins: Get What They Deserve. It is revealed that Minerva and Artemis were "an item" as she puts it, and they did not part on the best of terms).

Gaspard Paradizo
Gaspard Paradizo is the father of Minerva Paradizo. He briefly appears in Artemis Fowl and The Lost Colony. Following his successful reclamation of Holly Short and No. 1, he attempts to calm Minerva down after the great siege on Chateau Paradizo, but is knocked out when Billy Kong strikes him with a knife. Gaspard Paradizo is not mentioned in any of the other Artemis Fowl books.

Q

Qwan

Qwan is the last remaining member of the original ring of warlocks. He is the mentor of Qweffor and No.1, and is imprisoned in stone with all the other warlocks (except Qweffor, who is knocked into a volcano by Abbot) while trying to move Hybras into Limbo. Many years later, he and the other warlocks are found by humans, who think that the warlocks are statues.  They are transported to Taipei 101 as part of an exhibit until No. 1 sets Qwan free. No. 1 tries to free the others until Qwan informs him that the rest have died. Qwan guides Artemis, Holly, No. 1, and Qweffor in saving Hybras. Despite being over 10,000 years old chronologically, he has a spritely sense of humour similar to Foaly's and Holly's, owing to the fact he was still able to hear people talk at the exhibit while petrified. He is a master warlock, and leads the other warlocks in the spell that lifts Hybras out of time.

Qweffor

Qweffor is, as of Artemis Fowl and the Lost Colony, Qwan's warlock apprentice. His body is merged with  Leon Abbot's after Abbot pushes him into lava during the performance of the spell to lift Hybras out of time. However, he temporarily gains control of Abbot's body and helps save Hybras. No. 1 allows him to take permanent control of Abbot's body, to the delight of the apprentice, who admires Abbot's body, physique, and good genes. The only side effect is that this control is not complete. Qweffor has twitches, shakes and loss of bowel function until Abbot's consciousness is removed and placed into a guinea pig. This condition becomes commonly known as "Abbot's revenge".
Quillius the Great was his father.

R

Julius Root
Commander Julius Root, commonly known as Beetroot among some of the LEPrecon because his facial complexion is frequently purple, was the commander of the LEPrecon at the time Artemis Fowl first discovered the people. Prior to being promoted to Major, he was the most successful field operative in recon history, with many of his exploits involving the criminal dwarf Mulch Diggums. Root arrested Mulch on 8 occasions, one in which Mulch almost beheaded him with a diamond cutter, and the last after Mulch's successful break-in and robbery of Koboi Labs; Mulch was only caught because he tried to sell an experimental alchemy vat to one of Root's informants. This led to Mulch becoming overly familiar with Root, often calling him Julius to annoy the commander. While Commander Root's fearsome temper was his most notable trait, he was universally accepted as the best LEP commander of modern times, thanks to his immense experience, his willingness to get his hands dirty and think outside the box (it was his idea to recruit Mulch Diggums for the Fowl Manor siege), and absolute faith in the abilities of his trusted officers. Although Captain Holly Short thinks he dislikes her due to her being the first female officer in recon, he actually shows strong belief in her abilities, and is determined that she live up to her potential. He also reveals a deep liking for her later in the series, leading some officers to think of their friendship a father to daughter bond. Root threatens to resign when Holly's career is threatened after the Artemis Fowl affair, and is also responsible for her being recommended for the position of Major. However, before he can see this through, Root is killed in Artemis Fowl: The Opal Deception in a trick by Opal Koboi.

Turnball Root

Turnball Root is the elder brother of Julius Root. Turnball Root originally appeared in a short story featured in an exclusive edition of the Time Paradox, but he has since been used as the primary antagonist in Artemis Fowl: The Atlantis Complex. He kills Commander Vinyáya, escapes from jail and attempts to kidnap No.1 to grant his human wife Leonor eternal life. He fails in this mission, and he and his wife die while piloting an ambulance with a bomb into a deep sea trench. His known accomplices include Unix the sprite; Bobb Ragby, a dwarf; Ching Mayle, a goblin; and Leonor, his human wife. He uses thrall runes to enslave his wife; Vishby, his jail guard (whom he later kills); Captain Holly Short and Artemis Fowl II. Artemis escapes the runes' power by goading Ragby into electrocuting him.  In the process, he makes Orion, who was free of the runes' control, the dominant personality. Captain Short does not escape the runes' power.  She obeys Root and subsequently knocks out Juliet Butler, forcing Orion Fowl to shoot her with Root's chemical gun.

Root was previously a captain serving in LEPrecon, but was forced to quit after he tried to flood a section of Haven City in order to wipe out a competitor who was muscling in on his illegal mining operation. His younger brother stopped him just in time, which forced Root to flee to the surface and spend over five centuries on the run, during which he had 96 residences, including a villa near Nice, France. After the incident, Root has his own page in LEPrecon's Criminally Insane section.

In LEPrecon, Root lures his brother Julius into a trap while testing Holly Short in the Tern Islands, wishing to end Julius' endless chase of him. Along with his two cronies, Bobb Ragby and Unix B'Lob, he traps Holly Short and Trouble Kelp inside a human residence on the island and sets Short up for Julius to "tag" her (which would cause her to fail her test), while Bobb and Unix have their rifles turned at him. Short, however, manages to warn Julius and capture Root. After his capture, Root attempts to commit suicide by swallowing one of his Tunnel Blue spiders, which would rip his body apart from the inside. However, Julius saves his brother by forcing some coffee down Root's throat, which kills the spider.

Root dies in Artemis Fowl: The Atlantis Complex.

S

General Scalene

General Scalene is one of the commanding triad of the B'wa Kell, a criminal group of goblins.

The B'wa Kell performs illegal smuggling of various human merchandise. Scalene is first featured in the second book, Artemis Fowl: The Arctic Incident, where he is flattered by Opal Koboi and Briar Cudgeon with the exaggerated title of "general". Koboi manipulates and involves Scalene and his gang in her plan to seize control of Haven City. They smuggle human-manufactured batteries into the Lower Elements to power their softnose lasers, which they use in their attack on the city. After the failure of the rebellion, Scalene is incarcerated at Howler's Peak Goblin Correctional Facility.

In the fourth book, Artemis Fowl: The Opal Deception, Scalene has a minor role when he is visited in prison by Boohn, one of his thousands of nephews. Boohn covers his uncle in his own shedded skin, disguising Scalene, which allows him to escape from Howler's Peak. Scalene is then mesmerized by a crazed Koboi, whose wit was behind the whole escape. She straps Scalene to a bomb and attracts her enemies, Julius Root and Holly Short, to meet with the dazed Scalene, still under her hypnotic influence. Short and Root are led into the trap, and when the bomb detonates, Scalene and Root are killed instantly, while Short narrowly escapes.

Gola Schweem

Gola Schweem appears in Artemis Fowl: The Opal Deception. Schweem indirectly teaches Opal Koboi to descend into a self-induced coma. Koboi first successfully accomplishes this feat at the age of 14. Koboi uses this knowledge to become catatonic for 11 months while planning the destruction of her enemies.

Holly Short

Captain Holly Short is a female elf who at first works for the LEP as a LEPrecon (reconnaissance). She is exactly 3 feet tall and is slightly shorter than average, such a short stature can be a great advantage for the fairies. Short is talkative and sarcastic, with an auburn crew cut and hazel eyes, as well as the pointed ears and nut-brown skin typical of her species.  In Artemis Fowl: The Arctic Incident, she is said to be about 80 years old. Short is the first and only female officer in the organization LEPrecon. Her relationship with Artemis Fowl changes dramatically throughout the series, starting with a hostile and untrusting relationship, then progressing into respect and friendship, maybe even love in the sixth book.

Ark Sool

Commander Ark Sool is the highest-ranking gnome in the Lower Elements Police Internal Affairs department, introduced in Artemis Fowl: The Opal Deception.  An unusually tall and thin gnome, without the usual love of golden jewelry, like rings, necklaces and piercings, he is a strict and stubborn adherer to regulations; Holly considers him to be "the king of red-tape" and only interested in his career. His narrow-minded, no-nonsense attitude often pits him against the centaur Foaly, the fairies' chief technical advisor, and inadvertently causes Sool to assume that Captain Holly Short is the only possible murderer of Commander Julius Root.

Throughout the book, he single-mindedly pursues Short without even considering other possible suspects, and either refuses to consider evidence to the contrary, or fits it to see his own version of events. He also hypocritically accuses Foaly of the same act. In reality, Short is innocent; she was set up by the pixie genius and megalomaniac Opal Koboi as part of her plans for revenge. Sool has few friends due to his domineering nature, and is the only one of the eight tribunal members who finds Captain Short guilty. Even after Short is cleared of the crime, Sool intends to keep a close eye on her to catch any infractions. His promotion to LEPrecon commander compels Captain Short to leave the LEP so she can serve the Fairy People without having her every action scrutinized. His leadership also prompts Foaly to quit the LEP for a time in the fifth book, Artemis Fowl and the Lost Colony. Sool prompts a lockdown of forces when he discovers an abduction of a demon has taken place, leaving Holly without any fairy support in the field. Whilst Artemis and Holly save the demons in Limbo, Sool loses his position as head of the LEP after it is revealed that he plans to allow the eighth fairy family (demons) to die off. His successor is Trouble Kelp, an elf formerly after Holly's heart.

In Artemis Fowl: The Atlantis Complex, he is one of Captain Turnball Root's henchmen, looking after his wife until Captain Root escapes from prison.

Jon Spiro

Jon Spiro appears only in Artemis Fowl: The Eternity Code, in which he serves as the main  antagonist. He is a notorious Chicago businessman who owns the communications company Fission Chips.  He has a bodyguard by the name of Arno Blunt.

Spiro is a wealthy and shady businessman with mob connections, and though it is thought that his company made it to the top with stolen research, it was never proven. Spiro is a power-hungry megalomaniac. An illustration of his abuse of power is when he has the ballroom doors of the sunken Titanic recovered from the ocean floor and brought to the Spiro Needle to be used as his office doors. The Spiro Needle, owned by Spiro, is the headquarters for Fission Chips. He gets very angry at times, taking it out on others.

One of his assistants reveals that Spiro has a brother, but does not want to mention his brother's existence.

Spiro is described as "a middle-aged American, thin as a javelin, and barely taller than Artemis Fowl himself." He usually wears a white linen suit—his trademark—and a large amount of gold jewelry, including an ID bracelet, which was a birthday present to himself. He is on a strict diet and wears a vitamin dispenser on his belt. He has "gut problems," suggesting that he may have ulcerative colitis or Crohn's disease. Both diseases are triggered by stress, fitting his personality.

Artemis Fowl arranges a meeting with Spiro at a renowned London seafood restaurant, En Fin, to discuss his invention called the C Cube. During the meeting, however, Spiro outwits Artemis by disguising assassins in the restaurant where they have lunch. He steals the C Cube and leaves his bodyguard Arno Blunt to kill Artemis and Butler. He is eventually set up by Artemis Fowl and arrested by a SWAT team.

V

Chix Verbil

Private Chix Verbil is an amorous sprite who first appears in the later part of Artemis Fowl, the first book of the series.  Verbil, like all sprites, has wings, green skin, and loves to fly.

In the first Artemis Fowl novel, Verbil has a very small role: all that is required of him is to blow up the door holding the troll (or, as he puts it: "blowing the door off its damn hinges"), and stand guard over the ransom money, which he fails to do.

In Artemis Fowl: The Arctic Incident, Verbil shows himself to be an amateur Don Juan, and practices his moves unsuccessfully on Captain Holly Short while on a routine surveillance shift on Chute E37, a closed Parisian pressure elevator. While doing a routine flyby and thermal scan, two grey moving objects are detected. Immediately, Captain Short communications with Foaly, who admits that someone may have defeated his system, because when the thermal scan finds a grey zone it means that there are no living organisms. Short quickly commands Verbil to fly up to the surveillance pod, but he is too busy attempting to flirt with his attractive captain to pay much attention. At that moment, a laser fired by the B'wa Kell goblin gang punctures a hole through his wing.

Sprites have seven major arteries in their wings and the wound is large enough to have ruptured at least three. It is life-threatening due to sprites' limited healing powers. Short risks her life to go into the firefight and drag Verbil to safety. She heals the wound, but the injury prevents Verbil from flying long distances again.  The healing makes him pledge a debt to Short.

In the Artemis Fowl: The Opal Deception, Verbil (now a captain) interviews kleptomaniac dwarf Mulch Diggums, who breaks into a shuttleport so that he can steal a shuttle. After telling Verbil that Short is alive but in danger, and that Opal Koboi has escaped, Verbil reluctantly allows Diggums to knock him out and steal a shuttle (fulfilling his debt to Short, as Diggums was doing it to help her). Later, Verbil relays Diggums' message to Foaly, who checks on Koboi's status, which leads to the discovery that the Koboi in the clinic was a clone, which prompts Commander Ark Sool to order the launch of the supersonic shuttle.

In Artemis Fowl: Atlantis Complex, he receives a message from Short about the space probe heading for Atlantis. He does not tell Commander Kelp about it immediately because he thinks it's a prank message from his poker buddy Crooz.

Raine Vinyáya

Wing Commander Raine Vinyáya is an elf. She is on the fairy council and is the council chairwoman of the covert organization, Section Eight.

Appearing in minor roles or briefly mentioned in most of the earlier books (completely absent from Artemis Fowl: The Eternity Code) where she is consistently supportive of Holly Short and Julius Root, Vinyáya's first major appearance is in Artemis Fowl and the Lost Colony, in which Short is recruited by Section Eight. Captain Short was one of her pupils for flying courses in the LEP Academy. She quipped in Short's report that "she could pilot a shuttle pod through the gap between your teeth", both a compliment and a subtle jibe, in reference to the fact that the first time Short flew a shuttle she crash-landed it within two feet of Vinyáya.

Commander Vinyáya stops dyeing her hair by Artemis Fowl: The Lost Colony, revealing her natural colour to be silver. According to Artemis Fowl: The Arctic Incident, Vinyáya is an accomplished marksman, demanding an electric rifle with which to help shoot the goblins. Trouble Kelp later comments that "she hadn't missed yet".

In Artemis Fowl: The Atlantis Complex, Commander Vinyáya is killed by a space probe commandeered by Turnball Root. It is revealed she has a brother called Tarpon Vinyáya, who is the warden in the prison at Atlantis who inadvertently allowed Root to escape.

Commander Vinyáya's first name is given as Raine in the first chapter of Artemis Fowl: The Atlantis Complex.

Vishby
Vishby is a water elf prison guard who lives in Atlantis.  He first appears in is first mentioned in Artemis Fowl: The Opal Deception, when he is guarding Mulch Diggums in a prison shuttle on its way to the jails in Atlantis. Diggums often refers to him insultingly as "fishboy" because of the similarity of the two names. Vishby's second and last appearance is in Artemis Fowl: The Atlantis Complex, where he is a thrall of the criminal Turnball Root. As a thrall, he provides Root with all the materials he needs to escape jail. Vishby dies after Root leaves him to be crushed by his space probe.

Mikhael Vassikin

Mikhael Vassikin (Russian: Михаил Васикин) is a member of the Russian Mafia, one of two assigned to guard Artemis Fowl I in Artemis Fowl: The Arctic Incident.

Z

Giovanni Zito

Giovanni Zito is a wealthy Italian and a dedicated environmentalist from Sicily. Opal Koboi chooses him as her adopted parent in Artemis Fowl: The Opal Deception, and mesmerizes him into believing he is her father. With his help, Koboi is able to obtain great technology to reveal the existence of fairies. Zito is a very good friend of Artemis Fowl.  In Artemis Fowl and the Lost Colony, he gives Artemis passes for an opera in exchange for a case of Bordeaux so that Artemis may witness a possible demon materialization.

References

Artemis Fowl